Lagonda is a British luxury car marque now owned by Aston Martin. 

Lagonda may also refer to:
 Lagonda, Missouri, an unincorporated community
 Lagonda Creek, river in Springfield, Ohio, USA
 Lagonda Club, in Springfield, Ohio, USA
 Lagonda Manufacturing Company, now part of Elliott Tool Technologies 
 "Lagonda" (plantation), sugar plantation established by Lewis Strong Clarke
 Bela Lagonda (b. 1954) aka Alberto Hauss, German composer
 Staines Lagonda F.C., football club now called now Staines Town F.C.
 Lagonda IPA, India pale ale brewed by Marble Brewery, Manchester